Ivan Sergeyevich Gerget (Russian: Иван Сергеевич Гергет; born 6 March 2002) is a Russian artistic gymnast. He won the silver medal in the horizontal bar at the 2019 Junior World Artistic Gymnastics Championships held in Győr, Hungary.

In 2019, he won the silver medal in the men's all-around event at the 2019 Russian Junior Artistic Gymnastics Championships held in Penza, Russia.

Competitive history

References

External links 

 

Living people
2002 births
Place of birth missing (living people)
Russian male artistic gymnasts
Medalists at the Junior World Artistic Gymnastics Championships
People from Leninsk-Kuznetsky
Sportspeople from Kemerovo Oblast
21st-century Russian people